Gerrhonotus is a genus of anguid lizards that are commonly referred to as alligator lizards, due to a vague resemblance to an alligator. Along with glass lizards (Ophisaurus) and many other lizards, alligator lizards have the ability to regrow their tail.

Species and subspecies
There are nine recognized species in the genus Gerrhonotus. One species has recognized subspecies.

Gerrhonotus farri  – Farr's alligator lizard
Gerrhonotus infernalis  – Texas alligator lizard
Gerrhonotus lazcanoi 
Gerrhonotus liocephalus  – smooth-headed alligator lizard, Texas alligator lizard, Wiegmann's alligator lizard
Gerrhonotus liocephalus austrinus 
Gerrhonotus liocephalus liocephalus 
Gerrhonotus liocephalus loweryi  – Lowery's alligator lizard
Gerrhonotus lugoi  – Lugo's alligator lizard
Gerrhonotus mccoyi  
Gerrhonotus ophiurus 
Gerrhonotus parvus  – pygmy alligator lizard
Gerrhonotus rhombifer  – isthmian alligator lizard

References

External links

Further reading
Goin CJ, Goin OB, Zug GR (1978). Introduction to Herpetology, Third Edition. San Francisco: W.H. Freeman and Company. xi + 378 pp. . (Genus Gerrhonotus, pp. 292, 294).
Wiegmann AF (1828). "Beyträge zur Amphibienkunde". Isis von Oken 21 (4): 364–383. (Gerrhonotus, new genus, p. 379). (in German and Latin).

Gerrhonotus
Lizard genera
Taxa named by Arend Friedrich August Wiegmann